Petia Pavlova (Bulgarian: Петя Павлова), known mononymously as Petia, is a singer-songwriter and actress. In 1997 she became the face of Pepe Jeans London and the first Bulgarian pop artist with a song, played on MTV. The release of her dance record "Good Times" was the first ever single released by a Bulgarian artist on the UK market and along with her stage and club performances established Petia as the most popular pop-dance artist in her country. Petia moved to the UK in 1998 and spent 9 years living in London. She studied Commercial Music and Music Business Management at the University of Westminster for five years and graduated in 2004. Now Petia is living in USA, but still counts London as her second home and her "favorite place on Earth". She is working on a new music material and is making a return to acting in 2013, as stated in various media interviews.

Music career
 

Petia has released three albums: The Dream (in Bulgarian); Let's Make Love, a jazz album with songs from Broadway shows and film musicals, recorded with the Bulgarian National Radio Orchestra; and Runaway, for which Petia collaborated with well-known European songwriters and producers.

Runaway was released in Bulgaria in December 2006 through Max Music and is made available for purchase worldwide via internet distribution by InGrooves in July 2007. Three of the songs from the album—"Going Down", "Obscenely Delicious" and "Runaway"—entered various charts in Bulgaria and Europe. For the album Petia co-wrote some of the songs and also collaborated with high-profile producers such as Jam & Delgado (AQUA, Ace of Base), Pete Kirtley & Tim Hawes (Sugababes, No Angels), Morten Schjolin (Nelly, LeAnn Rimes, Simply Red), 2AM, DJ Supernova, Magga; and songwriters such as Peter Godwin (David Bowie, Steve Winwood), Julie Morrison (Louise, Boyzone), Obi Mhondrea (Sugababes, Blue) and Jane Vaughan (Thunderbugs, Blazin Squad, Victoria Beckham).

In September 2007 Petia's CD single "Obscenely Delicious" is released with seven club remixes, some of which produced by DJ Strobe and DJ Lion. The video of "Obscenely Delicious" reached No:5 in the MTV European's World Chart Express; No:5 in the Bulgarian Top 100 and in October 2007 entered also the Top 50 Chart of MAD TV Greece – the first entry of a Bulgarian artist in the Greek charts.

"Going Down", "Obscenely Delicious" and "Runaway" videos of Petia were three of the most requested and played videos in Bulgaria for 2007 and her album Runaway was nominated for Album of the Year by MM TV.

In December 2007 Petia was nominated for a Woman of the Year Award by Grazia Magazine.

In 2014 Petia released the single "Your Love's Bad For My Health".

Television and film

Petia began to take professional acting, singing and dancing lessons at very young age and during her school years was part of various acting and singing troupes in her country. Later, while living in London, she continued her acting activities.

As an actress Petia appears with Sacha Baron Cohen in Ali G Indahouse and with Tomas Arana in Spooks. She also has been seen in a high-profile television commercial for British Gas in the UK in 2002.

In March 2007 Petia was invited to take part in Celebrity Big Brother (VIP Brother) reality show in Bulgaria. She accepted and stayed in the Big Brother house for 12 days. Later in interviews Petia says that taking part in the show was one of the most interesting experiences she has had.

Petia has also guest-presented as Star Reporter on the prime time TV News Daily Broadcasting on Nova TV and hosted her own show Petia's Music Show on MSAT TV in 2008.

In September 2008, Petia joined the cast of the TV drama Forbidden Love, taking the role of Sonya. The TV series was aired on Nova TV in Bulgaria.

In January 2013, Petia moved to Los Angeles to focus on acting.

Modelling

In 1997, Petia became the face and spokesperson of Pepe Jeans London, helping to popularise the brand, when the company first arrived on the Bulgarian market.

In 2007, Petia signed one year sponsorship deal with Sobieski vodka and they released her 12-page 2007 swimsuit calendar. In 2008, Petia was "The Party Girl" of the cover of June 2008 issue of GO Guide. In 2009, Petia modelled the Spring/Summer collection of DEMOBAZA.

Petia is featured on the cover of magazines such as: INTRO, GO, Grazia, OK!, CLUB M, MODA and many more.

Discography

Albums
 The Dream  (1994)
 Let's Make Love (1996)
 Runaway (2006)

Singles
 "Good Times" (1997)
 "Cry for My Love" (2002)
 "Mirage" (2004)
 "Superwoman" (2005)
 "Obscenely Delicious" (2007)
 "Your Love's Bad For My Health" (2014)

Videos
 "A Fine Romance" (1996)
 "Good Times" (1997)
 "Cry for My Love" (2002)
 "Mirage" (2004)
 "Going Down" (2006)
 "Runaway" (2007)
 "Obscenely Delicious" (2007)
 "Obscenely Delicious" (DJ Strobe version) (2008)

Influences
Petia is inspired by jazz artists such as Ella Fitzgerald and Frank Sinatra, as well as pop singers and entertainers such as Madonna and Prince. She has also stated fashion, movies and travelling are source of inspiration for her songwriting and performances.

References

External links

 
 

1978 births
21st-century Bulgarian women singers
Living people
Bulgarian pop singers
Big Brother (Bulgarian TV series) contestants
English-language singers from Bulgaria
Alumni of the University of Westminster
Musicians from London